Rebecca Louise Leirmo Harvey (née Angus; born 2 December 1985)  is an English football striker, who most recently played for Vålerenga of Norway's Toppserien.

Angus came from the American South Atlantic Conference when she signed for Kolbotn Fotball in the Toppserien in 2007. She became an important player in her two last seasons in the team scoring 21 goals, which earned her a move to Jitex BK in the Swedish Damallsvenskan. For the 2012 season she returned to the Toppserien to play for newly-promoted Vålerenga.

In 2008 she played for the England women's national under-23 football team.

References

External links

1985 births
Living people
English women's footballers
Expatriate women's footballers in Norway
English expatriate sportspeople in Norway
People from Redcar
Carson–Newman University alumni
England women's under-23 international footballers
Women's association football forwards
Jitex BK players
Kolbotn Fotball players
Vålerenga Fotball Damer players
Damallsvenskan players
Toppserien players
Expatriate women's footballers in Sweden
English expatriate sportspeople in Sweden